Raková is a village and municipality in Čadca District in the Žilina Region of northern Slovakia.

History 
In historical records the village was first mentioned in 1658.
The village is the birthplace of the writer and playwright Ján Palárik, who is honored by the annual Palárikova Raková event and who played a significant role in the Slovak nationalist movement in the 19th century.

Geography 
The municipality lies at an altitude of 427 metres and covers an area of 41.52 km2. It has a population of about 5,500 people.

References

External links 
http://www.statistics.sk/mosmis/eng/run.html

Villages and municipalities in Čadca District